Animals that are held by humans and prevented from escaping are said to be in captivity. The term is usually applied to wild animals that are held in confinement, but may also be used generally to describe the keeping of domesticated animals such as livestock or pets. This may include, for example, animals in farms, private homes, zoos and laboratories. Animal captivity may be categorized according to the particular motives, objectives and conditions of the confinement.

History

Throughout history not only domestic animals as pets and livestock were kept in captivity and under human care, but also wild animals.  Despite the fact that wild animals have been harbored by humans for thousands of years, this captivity has not always approximated present zoos. Some were failed domestication attempts. Also, in past times, primarily the wealthy, aristocrats and kings collected wild animals for various reasons. The affluent built the first zoos as personal collections to demonstrate their dominance. These private collections of animals were known as menageries. Contrary to domestication, the ferociousness and natural behaviour of the wild animals were preserved and exhibited. Today's zoos claim other reasons for keeping animals under human care: conservation, education and science.

Behavior of animals in captivity 
Captive animals, especially those not domesticated, sometimes develop abnormal behaviours.

One type of abnormal behaviour is stereotypical behaviors, i.e. repetitive and apparently purposeless motor behaviors. Examples of stereotypical behaviours include pacing, self-injury, route tracing and excessive self-grooming. These behaviors are associated with stress and lack of stimulation. Animals that exhibit this tend to suffer from zoochosis, as it is manifested in stereotypical behaviors. Many who keep animals in captivity attempt to prevent or decrease stereotypical behavior by introducing stimuli, a process known as environmental enrichment. The goals of environmental enrichment are to make environments more complex and fluid, offer more engaging and complex processes, and give animals more chances to make decisions. Techniques that are commonly used to provide environmental enrichment include social, occupation, physical, sensory, and nutritional.

A type of abnormal behavior shown in captive animals is self-injurious behavior (SIB). Self-injurious behavior indicates any activity that involves biting, scratching, hitting, hair plucking, or eye poke that may result in injuring oneself. Although its reported incidence is low, self-injurious behavior is observed across a range of primate species, especially when they experience social isolation in infancy. Self-bite involves biting one's own body—typically the arms, legs, shoulders, or genitals. Threat bite involves biting one's own body—typically the hand, wrist, or forearm—while staring at the observer, conspecific, or mirror in a threatening manner. Self-hit involves striking oneself on any part of the body. Eye poking is a behavior (widely observed in primates) that presses the knuckle or finger into the orbital space above the eye socket. Hair plucking is a jerking motion applied to one's own hair with hands or teeth, resulting in its excessive removal.

The proximal causes of self-injurious behavior have been widely studied in captive primates; either social or nonsocial factors can trigger this type of behavior. Social factors include changes in group composition, stress, separation from the group, approaches by or aggression from members of other groups, conspecific male individuals nearby, separation from females, and removal from the group. Social isolation, particularly disruptions of early mother-rearing experiences, is an important risk factor. Studies have suggested that, although mother-reared rhesus macaques still exhibit some self-injurious behaviors, nursery-reared rhesus macaques are much more likely to self-abuse than mother-reared ones. Nonsocial factors include the presence of a small cut, a wound or irritant, cold weather, human contact, and frequent zoo visitors. For example, a study has shown that zoo visitor density positively correlates with the number of gorillas banging on the barrier, and that low zoo visitor density caused gorillas to behave in a more relaxed way. Captive animals often cannot escape the attention and disruption caused by the general public, and the stress resulting from this lack of environmental control may lead to an increased rate of self-injurious behaviors.

Studies suggest that many abnormal captive behaviors, including self-injurious behavior, can be successfully treated by pair housing. Pair housing provides a previously single-housed animal with a same-sex social partner. This method is especially effective with primates, which are widely known to be social animals. Social companionship provided by pair housing encourages social interaction, thus reducing abnormal and anxiety-related behavior in captive animals as well as increasing their locomotion.

See also 

Animal husbandry
 Agriculture
 Animal husbandry
 Animal testing
 Domestication
 Intensive animal farming
 Free-range
 Livestock
 Working animal

Animal rights 
 Animal–industrial complex
 Animal rights
 Animal sacrifice
 Animal welfare 
 Blood sport
 Cruelty to animals
 List of animal welfare and animal rights groups
 Personhood#Non-human animals
 Testing cosmetics on animals
 World Animal Protection

Wild animal keeping
 Animal sanctuary
 Aquarium
 Behavioral enrichment
 Beluga whale#Captivity
 Captive elephants
 Captive killer whales
 Circus#Animal acts
 Dolphinarium
 Game reserve
 Human-animal communication
 Marine mammal park
 Menagerie
 Oceanarium
 Public Aquarium
 Safari Park
 Species reintroduction
 Wildlife trade
 Zoological garden
 Insectarium

References

External links
 Pet-Abuse.com
 World Association of Zoos and Aquaria
 New York Zoos and Aquarium
 WSPA international website

Zoos
Animals in captivity
Cultural history
Cultural studies

de:Gefangenschaftshaltung